Diocese of Calgary may refer to the following ecclesiastical jurisdictions with seat in Calgary, Alberta, Canada:

 Roman Catholic Diocese of Calgary
 Anglican Diocese of Calgary